
Gmina Żary is a rural gmina (administrative district) in Żary County, Lubusz Voivodeship, in western Poland. Its seat is the town of Żary, although the town is not part of the territory of the gmina.

Villages
Gmina Żary contains the villages and settlements of Biedrzychowice Dolne, Bieniów, Bogumiłów, Dąbrowiec, Drozdów, Drożków, Grabik, Janików, Kadłubia, Łaz, Lubanice, Lubomyśl, Łukawy, Marszów, Miłowice, Mirostowice Dolne, Mirostowice Górne, Olbrachtów, Olszyniec, Rościce, Rusocice, Siodło, Stawnik, Surowa, Włostów and Złotnik.

Neighbouring gminas
Gmina Żary is bordered by the towns of Żagań and Żary, and by the gminas of Iłowa, Jasień, Lipinki Łużyckie, Nowogród Bobrzański, Przewóz, Wymiarki and Żagań.

Twin towns – sister cities

Gmina Żary is twinned with:
 Neuhausen/Spree, Germany

References

Zary
Żary County